RG Jones Sound Engineering was founded in 1926 by Reginald Geoffrey Jones (1912–1987) of Caerphilly in Wales.

The RG Jones company and Swanson Sound Service are considered the oldest sound reinforcement companies in the world which are still in operation.

RG Jones worked as a salesman for Milton Products in busy street markets where he could not be heard above the crowd. To solve the problem he built a public address system which he mounted on top of the caravan (trailer) he conducted business out of.  The public address system consisted of a microphone connected to an amplifier which fed two large wooden horns he had constructed.  Four 12 V batteries were used to power a rotary 48 V to 230 V converter to provide portable electricity for the system.  The Miltoton Products Company then asked him to build fifteen more of these systems which is when he started the R.G. Jones company.

The company is still in business providing sound systems for festivals, concerts, sporting and special events.  They also have a large installed sound business providing service to churches, businesses and schools.

References 

Electronics companies of the United Kingdom
Audio engineering
Electronics companies established in 1932
1932 establishments in England
British companies established in 1932
Manufacturing companies established in 1932